Polygrammodes fusinotalis is a moth in the family Crambidae. It was described by Paul Dognin in 1923. It is found in Loja Province, Ecuador.

References

Spilomelinae
Moths described in 1923
Moths of South America